Draško Vojinović (Serbian Cyrillic: Дpaшкo Bojинoвић ; born December 3, 1984 in Subotica) is a Serbian football player who currently plays for Nyíregyháza Spartacus.

References
Profile at HLSZ.
Profile at MLSZ.

1984 births
Living people
Sportspeople from Subotica
Serbian footballers
Association football goalkeepers
FK Spartak Subotica players
Serbian expatriate footballers
Expatriate footballers in Hungary
Integrál-DAC footballers
Serbian expatriate sportspeople in Hungary
Diósgyőri VTK players
Nyíregyháza Spartacus FC players